Drillia phymaticus is a species of sea snail, a marine gastropod mollusk in the family Drilliidae.

Description

Distribution
This marine species occurs off Japan.

References

 World Wide Mollusk Species Data Base: Drillia phymaticus

External links

phymaticus
Gastropods described in 1885